Rashtrabadi Ekta Party is a political party in Nepal. The party is registered with the Election Commission of Nepal ahead of the 2008 Constituent Assembly election.

References

Political parties in Nepal